Raymond Virgil Marron (May 21, 1899 – July 19, 1978) was an American football coach.  
Marron was the head football coach at the United States Coast Guard Academy in New London, Connecticut.  He held that position for the 1922 and 1923 seasons. His record at Coast Guard was 0–6.

Head coaching record

See also
 List of college football coaches with 0 wins

References

External links
 

1899 births
1978 deaths
Coast Guard Bears football coaches
Sportspeople from Denver